Dobev is a municipality in Písek District in the South Bohemian Region of the Czech Republic. It has about 1,000 inhabitants.

Administrative parts

The municipality is made up of villages of Malé Nepodřice, Nová Dobev, Oldřichov, Stará Dobev and Velké Nepodřice. The municipal office is located in Stará Dobev, which is the largest and most populated part.

Geography
The western part of the municipal territory lies in the České Budějovice Basin, the eastern part lies in the Tábor Uplands. The municipality contains several ponds, the largest being Dobevský.

History
The first written mention of Dobev is from 1318.

Transport
Dobev is situated on the road from Písek to Strakonice. The D4 motorway passes through the northwestern part of the municipal territory.

Sights
The landmark of Dobev is the Church of Saint Brice from the late 14th century. The originally Gothic church was rebuilt in 1881.

References

External links

 (in Czech)

Villages in Písek District